The 2nd Annual Grammy Awards were held on November 29, 1959, at Los Angeles and New York. They recognized musical accomplishments by performers for the year 1959. Hosted by Meredith Willson, this marked the first televised Grammy Award ceremony, and it was aired in episodes as special Sunday Showcase. It was held in the same year as the first Grammy Awards in 1959, and no award ceremony was held in 1960. These awards recognized musical accomplishments by performers for that particular year. Frank Sinatra and Duke Ellington each won three awards.

Award winners
Record of the Year
Bobby Darin for "Mack the Knife"
Album of the Year
Frank Sinatra for Come Dance with Me!
Song of the Year
Jimmy Driftwood for "The Battle of New Orleans"
Best New Artist
Bobby Darin

Children's
Best Recording for Children
Peter Ustinov for Prokofiev: Peter and the Wolf performed by Peter Ustinov & the Philharmonia Orchestra conducted by Herbert von Karajan

Classical
Best Classical Performance - Orchestra
Charles Münch (conductor) & the Boston Symphony Orchestra for Debussy: Images for Orchestra
Best Classical Performance - Vocal Soloist (with or without orchestra)
Jussi Björling for Bjoerling in Opera
Best Classical Performance - Opera Cast or Choral
Erich Leinsdorf (conductor), Lisa Della Casa, Rosalind Elias, George London, Roberta Peters, Giorgio Tozzi & the Vienna Philharmonic Orchestra for Mozart: The Marriage of Figaro
Best Classical Performance - Concerto or Instrumental Soloist (with full orchestral accompaniment)
Kiril Kondrashin (conductor), Van Cliburn & the Symphony of the Air Orchestra for Rachmaninoff: Piano Concerto No. 3
Best Classical Performance - Concerto or Instrumental Soloist (other than full orchestral accompaniment)
Arthur Rubinstein for Beethoven: Sonatas No. 21 in C (Waldstein) and No. 18 in E Flat
Best Classical Performance - Chamber Music (including chamber orchestra)
Arthur Rubinstein for Beethoven: Sonatas No. 21 in C (Waldstein) and No. 18 in E Flat

Comedy 
Best Comedy Performance - Spoken
Shelley Berman for Inside Shelley Berman
Best Comedy Performance - Musical
Homer and Jethro for The Battle of Kookamonga

Composing and arranging
Best Musical Composition First Recorded and Released in 1959 (more than 5 minutes duration)
Duke Ellington for Anatomy of a Murder Soundtrack
Best Sound Track Album - Background Score from a Motion Picture or Television
Duke Ellington (composer) for Anatomy of a Murder
Best Arrangement
Billy May (arranger) for "Come Dance with Me" performed by Frank Sinatra

Country
Best Country & Western Performance
Johnny Horton for "The Battle of New Orleans"

Folk
Best Performance - Folk
The Kingston Trio for The Kingston Trio at Large

Jazz
Best Jazz Performance - Soloist
Ella Fitzgerald for Ella Swings Lightly
Best Jazz Performance - Group
Jonah Jones for I Dig Chicks

Musical show
Best Broadway Show Album
Ethel Merman & the original cast for  Gypsy
The original cast with Gwen Verdon, Richard Kiley, Leonard Stone, Doris Rich, Cynthia Latham, Joy Nichols, Bob Dixon & Pat Ferrier for Redhead
Best Sound Track Album, Original Cast - Motion Picture or Television
André Previn, Ken Darby & the original cast for Porgy and Bess

Packaging and notes
Best Album Cover
Robert M. Jones (art director) for Shostakovich: Symphony No. 5 conducted by Howard Mitchell

Pop
Best Vocal Performance, Female
Ella Fitzgerald for "But Not for Me"
Best Vocal Performance, Male
Frank Sinatra for Come Dance with Me!
Best Performance by a Vocal Group or Chorus
Richard P. Condie (choir director) for "The Battle Hymn of the Republic" performed by the Mormon Tabernacle Choir directed by Condie
Best Performance by a Dance Band
Duke Ellington for Anatomy of a Murder
Best Performance by an Orchestra
André Previn & David Rose for Like Young performed by Dave Rose and his Orchestra with André Previn
Best Performance by a "Top 40" Artist
Nat "King" Cole for "Midnight Flyer"

Production and engineering
Best Engineering Contribution - Other Than Classical or Novelty
Robert Simpson (engineer) for Belafonte at Carnegie Hall performed by Harry Belafonte
Best Engineering Contribution - Classical Recording
Lewis W. Layton (engineer), Robert Russell Bennett (conductor) & the RCA Victor Symphony Orchestra for Victory at Sea, Vol. I
Best Engineering Contribution - Novelty Recording
Ted Keep (engineer) for "Alvin's Harmonica" performed by David Seville

R&B
Best Rhythm & Blues Performance
Dinah Washington for "What a Diff'rence a Day Makes"

Spoken
Best Performance - Documentary or Spoken Word (other than comedy)
Carl Sandburg for A Lincoln Portrait

References

 002
1959 in Los Angeles
1959 in New York City
1959 music awards
1959 in American music
November 1959 events in the United States
Events in Los Angeles
Events in New York City